James "Jim" Crossley (birth unknown – death unknown) was an English professional rugby league footballer who played in the 1930s and 1940s.

Background
James Crossley was born in Normanton, Wakefield, West Riding of Yorkshire, England.

Playing career

County League appearances
James Crossley played in Castleford's victory in the Yorkshire County League during the 1938–39 season.

Challenge Cup Final appearances
James Crossley played right-, i.e. number 12, in Castleford's 11-8 victory over Huddersfield in the 1935 Challenge Cup Final during the 1934–35 season at Wembley Stadium, London on Saturday 4 May 1935, in front of a crowd of 39,000.

Testimonial match
A joint benefit season/testimonial match at Castleford for; Jim Crossley, Harold Haley, Pat McManus, and Frank Smith took place during the 1947–48 season.

Genealogical information
James Crossley was the great-nephew of the rugby league footballer who played in the 1900s for Loscoe White Rose (in Featherstone); W. Crossley.

References

External links
Search for "Crossley" at rugbyleagueproject.org
Image - Loscoe White Rose team 1903 (featuring W. Crosssley)
Jim Crossley Memory Box Search at archive.castigersheritage.com
Search for "James Crossley" at britishnewspaperarchive.co.uk
Search for "Jim Crossley" at britishnewspaperarchive.co.uk

Castleford Tigers players
English rugby league players
Place of death missing
Rugby league second-rows
Rugby league players from Wakefield
Sportspeople from Normanton, West Yorkshire
Year of birth missing
Year of death missing